The Band That Would Be King is an album released by the Maryland rock group Half Japanese. It was also their third and last studio album released on their label, 50 Skidillion Watts.

Critical reception
Trouser Press wrote that "a lot of the songs are fragmentary, and the music — a sloppy mess of guitars, harmonica and saxophones — sounds largely improvised, but a few tunes ('Some Things Last a Long Time,' 'Postcard from Far Away,' etc.) are genuinely delightful."

Track listing

(last three only mentioned on label, not on the sleeve)

Personnel
Half Japanese

 Jad Fair – vocals, guitar, harmonica
 Don Fleming – guitar, vocals
 Mr. J. Rice – guitar
 Rob Kennedy –  bass
 Scott Jarvis –  drums
 Kramer – organ, bass

Guest Musicians 

 Fred Frith – guitar on 2, 15, 18
 George Cartwright – saxophone on 4, 16, 27
 John Zorn  – saxophone on 21

Production

 Kramer – recording, mixing, production
David Fair – cover

References 

1989 albums
Half Japanese albums
50 Skidillion Watts albums